James Irving may refer to:

James K. Irving (born 1928), Canadian businessman
James Gordon Irving (1913–2012), American illustrator
James Dergavel Irving (1860–1933), Canadian businessman